Joe LaCava is an American politician and engineer serving as a member of the San Diego City Council from the 1st district. He assumed office in December 2020, succeeding Barbara Bry who ran for mayor of San Diego.

Early life and education 
Joe LaCava was raised in the San Diego neighborhoods of Logan Heights and University Heights, before moving to Allied Gardens. After graduating Patrick Henry High School, he went to San Diego State University, where he earned his bachelor's degree in engineering.

Career 
LaCava worked for the United States Forest Service in Northern California upon graduation, and became a civil engineer when he returned to San Diego. He served on the Bird Rock Community Council before becoming chairman of the La Jolla Community Planning group.

He ran for the San Diego City Council seat vacated by Barbara Bry and won in both primary and general election contests during the 2020 San Diego elections, defeating general election candidate Will Moore. He took office in December of 2020.

Reference 

San Diego City Council members
San Diego State University alumni
Year of birth missing (living people)
Living people